The DBLCI-OY Balanced has the same underlying 14 commodities as the DBLCI-OY Broad, but, the energy sector weight is reduced from 55% of the broad index to 35%. The DBLCI-OY Balanced is designed to be UCITS III compliant, that is the weight of no single commodity or strongly correlated securities exceed 35%. The DBLCI-OY Balanced is listed as an ETF on the Deutsche Börse.

In terms of sector weights, the DBLCI-OY Balanced is broadly similar to the S&P GSCI Light Energy Index and the Dow Jones-AIG commodity index although the DBLCI-OY Broad has no exposure to the livestock sector, but, instead has a higher allocation to precious metals.

Characteristics 
 Consists of 14 commodities drawn from the energy, precious metals, industrial metals and agriculture sectors.
 Index rolling mechanism is based on DB’s Optimum Yield technology.
 UCITS III compliant.
 Maximum sector allocation is limited to 35%.

See also 
Deutsche Bank Liquid Commodity Index
DBLCI Optimum Yield Index
DBLCI Mean Reversion Index
Dow Jones–AIG Commodity Index
Reuters-CRB Index
Rogers International Commodity Index
Standard & Poor's Commodity Index

Commodity price indices